Svend Petersen (March 13, 1911 – January 18, 1992) was a Danish–born author, political researcher and analyst, Trans-O-Gram puzzle creator, one of the four founding officers of The Red Circle of Washington D.C. and a member of The Baker Street Irregulars.

Early life and career
Svend was born on March 13, 1911, in Kolding, Denmark, the son of Karen Elizabeth and Alarius Peter Vilhelm Petersen.  At 10 months of age, his parents immigrated with him to the United States, arriving at Ellis Island April 20, 1912, on board the RMS Celtic (1901).

Little is known about his early life until about 1920 where the US Federal Census finds him living in Salem, Kenosha, Wisconsin with his mother, sister, brother and Uncle.  His father is believed to have died a year earlier.  In 1925 the Iowa State Census finds him living Newell, Buena Vista, Iowa with his sister Helen.  The whereabouts of his mother are unknown at this point.  The 1930 US Federal Census finds him renting a room in Newell, Buena Vista, Iowa.

From late 1950 through the 1970s Svend worked in a political research capacity for several Republican Congressmen.

Published books
 The testamentary capacity of Sherlock Holmes ;: Parallel case ; The unwritten canon lore, 1953
 I claim urgency!, 1953
 A statistical history of our Presidential elections, 1955
 A Sherlock Holmes Almanac, 1956
 Mark Twain & the Government, 1960
 House of Representatives voting records for 1959, 1960
 House of Representatives voting records for 1960, 1960
 A Statistical History of the American Presidential Elections, 1963
 The Gettysburg Addresses The Story of Two Orations, 1963
 A Statistical History of the American Presidential Elections., 1968
 Trans-o-grams: Fifty brand new, hitherto unpublished puzzles, containing quotes of historical, political and Biblical interest, interspersed with poetical wit and humor, 1973
 A Statistical History of the American Presidential Elections: With Supplementary Tables Covering 1968-1980, 1981

Other published works
 The Little Rock against the Big Rock, 1943
 Arkansas' Favorite Son, 1944
 Arkansas State Tuberculosis Sanatorium: The Nation's Largest, 1946
 Arkansas in Presidential Elections, 1963
 President Carter and the Honeymooners, National Review, 1977

Family and death

On September 4, 1937, Svend married Mary Agnes Ates.  Mary is the niece of Roscoe Blevel Ates.  Svend and Mary produced 3 children - 2 boys and 1 girl.

Svend died on January 18, 1992, of natural causes in Seminole, Florida.

Historical importance

While Svend never played a 'front stage' role in American Politics, his dedication to research helped public officials clearly articulate issues affecting the United States.  His writings are frequently referenced by political pundits, college students writing papers and researches seeking statistical clarity on our political history.  He was a man with merely a high school education but a superior intellect and a strong desire to help his country succeed.

References 

1911 births
1992 deaths
People from Kolding
Danish emigrants to the United States
American political scientists
20th-century Danish non-fiction writers
Sherlock Holmes scholars
Puzzle designers
American non-fiction writers
20th-century American writers
Male non-fiction writers
20th-century political scientists